The Hong Kong Economic, Trade and Cultural Office (HKETCO) is the representative office of Hong Kong in the Republic of China. Its counterpart body in Hong Kong is the Taipei Economic and Cultural Office in Hong Kong.

The office is located at the President International Tower (統一國際大樓) in Xinyi District, Taipei.

History
The office started to operate in Taiwan in 19 December 2011. On 15 May 2012, Minister of Mainland Affairs Council of the Republic of China Lai Shin-yuan oversaw the opening ceremony of the office. Also present during the opening ceremony was John Tsang, Financial Secretary of the Hong Kong SAR. He said during his opening note that Taiwan and Hong Kong have made substantial progress in the area of economic exchanges, cultural exchanges, financial supervision cooperation, bilateral transportation arrangement and cargo transshipment. The office suspended operation on 18 May 2021.

List of directors

 John Leung (7 December 2011 – 11 August 2015)
 Rex Chang (12 August 2015 – 28 July 2018)

Transportation
The office is accessible within walking distance south of Taipei City Hall Station of the Taipei Metro.

See also
 Hong Kong–Taiwan Economic and Cultural Co-operation and Promotion Council
 Taiwan–Hong Kong Economic and Cultural Co-operation Council
 Hong Kong Economic and Trade Office
 Foreign relations of Hong Kong
 List of diplomatic missions in Taiwan
 Cross-Strait relations
 One-China policy
 Macau Economic and Cultural Office

References

2011 establishments in Taiwan
2021 disestablishments in Taiwan
Hong Kong–Taiwan relations
Representative Offices in Taipei
Taiwan
Government agencies established in 2011
Government agencies disestablished in 2021
Defunct diplomatic missions